is a railway station on the Aizu Railway Aizu Line in the city of Aizuwakamatsu, Fukushima Prefecture, Japan, operated by the Aizu Railway.

Lines

Station layout
Ashinomaki-Onsen Station has two opposed unnumbered side platforms connected by a level crossing. The station is staffed.

Platforms

Adjacent stations

Bus, Love and Peach, the station master cats
Bus was named after the Catbus from My Neighbor Totoro. Bus had been a resident of the station since June, 2000. She was appointed as the honorary stationmaster in April 2008. She had worked with a human station master and retired in December 2015.  succeeded the honorary stationmaster. He started working with them from July, 2014. Bus stayed in the station also after retirement with the title of honorary stationmaster of admirable longevity. She died on April 22, 2016. On October 14, 2017, who is Love's younger brother, was appointed as the rail manager (Head of facilities management). He retired in March 2020. , who is a younger sister of Love and Peach, began to work as an apprentice station staff in the spring 2020. She was appointed as an attendant on April 17, 2021. On October 5, 2022, Love died at the age of eight.

History
The station was renamed to its present name on July 16, 1987.

Surrounding area

Kamimiyori Post Office
 Ashinomaki-Onsen

See also
 List of railway stations in Japan

References

External links

  Aizu Railway Station information 

Railway stations in Fukushima Prefecture
Aizu Line
Railway stations in Japan opened in 1927
Aizuwakamatsu